Seattle Pride refers to a series of events which are held annually throughout the month of June to celebrate LGBT Pride in Seattle, Washington. Seattle Pride also refers to the nonprofit organization Seattle Out and Proud which coordinates and promotes LGBTQIA+ events and programs in Seattle year-round including the Seattle Pride Parade.

History
From June 24 to June 30, 1974, Seattle’s lesbians and gays celebrated the city’s first Gay Pride Week. This was the first event in the region in which the gay community as a whole came out of its collective closet. The week started off Monday evening, June 25 with an Open House and discussion sponsored by the Stonewall Recovery Center, a drug treatment program. June 26 was a discussion on transsexuality at the University of Washington Hub Ballroom. On the evening of June 27 a Memorial Service was held at the Metropolitan Community Church to commemorate the victims of the 1973 Upstairs Lounge arson attack in the New Orleans gay bar that claimed 32 lives. This was followed by a one-woman show dramatizing the event entitled "Lavender Troubadour" written and performed and sung by Rebecca Valrejean. 

On June 28, 1974, the Gay Community Center at 1726 16th Avenue held its official grand opening. This included a poetry reading by Katherine Bourne, and music by Patrick Haggerty and Sue Issacs of the band Lavender Country. On June 29, 1974, a Saturday, the Seattle Post-Intelligencer reported that about 200 attended a picnic at Occidental Park in Pioneer Square. Entertainment included music and a "Gayrilla theater." Banners from the stage read "Proud to be lesbian, Proud to be gay." In the afternoon, activities moved to Volunteer Park and included roller-skating and a sing along at the top of the Volunteer Park Water Tower. That evening, a street dance was held in Occidental Park that featured music by Blue Moon, Lavender Country and Sue Isaacs. On June 30, 1974, Gay Pride Week concluded with a "Gay-In" at the Seattle Center that featured "zany dress, general frivolity, carousing and a circle dance around the main International fountain."

The local band Lavender Country, noted as the first known openly gay country music act, also performed during the 1974 festival. The band also later performed a reunion show at Seattle Pride in 2000, following a resurgence of interest when their album was archived at the Country Music Hall of Fame.

1977 marked the first official Gay Pride week declared by Mayor Wes Uhlman. The year that followed was particularly impactful. With a broader acceptance of the LGBTQ+ community came a rise in organized “anti-gay forces” determined to repeal many ordinances that protected LGBTQ+ rights. During the 1978 Pride Week, more than 3000 participants marched in protest on the parade route that ran from Occidental Square Park in Pioneer Square to Westlake Park by way of First Avenue. Voters defeated the initiative, preserving the many political gains of that decade. The Parade route remained in place until the early 8-s when it began trading years with Capitol Hill, until it was "permanently" moved to Broadway. In 1992, Gay Pride week was expanded to include bisexual and transgender identities (LGBT).  In 2006 the Seattle Pride Parade moved from Capitol Hill back to Downtown Seattle where it originated.

Seattle Pride 
Seattle Pride is a nonprofit organization that coordinates and promotes LGBTQIA+ events and programs in Seattle year-round. The organization aims to create unity, honor diversity, and achieve equal human rights throughout the region and the world through a variety of programs including its Pride Speaks speaker series, Vote with Pride voter engagement program, and its community grant and sponsorship program. 

The organization is best known as the producer of the Seattle Pride Parade, held on the last Sunday in June to honor Stonewall, marking the start of the gay rights movement in the United States. The event attracts 300,000-plus spectators annually with more than 200 groups marching in support of LGBTQIA+ Pride down 4th Avenue in Downtown Seattle. 

The organization is also known as the producer of the Seattle Pride in the Park Festival held on the first Saturday in June in Volunteer Park on Capitol Hill. The free family-friendly event features performances by LGBTQIA+ performers, kids activities, booths, and food trucks. 

The 2013 Pride Parade was notable for the participation of uniformed members of the Boy Scouts of America, celebrating the recent decision by that organization to allow openly gay boys to join as Scouts. In 2020 and 2021, the organization held virtual Pride Month celebrations in lieu of the Seattle Pride Parade and  Seattle Pride in the Park Festival in response to the COVID-19 pandemic.

PrideFest

Seattle PrideFest is held annually at the Seattle Center over Pride Weekend. The festival takes place on the last Sunday in June between noon and 8 pm, immediately following the Pride Parade. This event formerly took place in neighboring Capitol Hill's Volunteer Park, but outgrew that residential location. It was decided in 2006 to move the annual parade to downtown and festival to the Seattle Center to better accommodate the growing attendance. In 2007, sponsor Seattle Out and Proud was threatened with bankruptcy because the downtown event had been so expensive. Egan Orion of One Degree Events took over the Seattle Pride Festival just six weeks before the event was held, in order to save the event and help preserve the move to the Center the year before. The event was compressed from three days to one, and organizers negotiated a plan with the city to pay an outstanding debt from the 2006 event. The 2008 PrideFest had record numbers at the Seattle Center with over 50,000 people attending on a 95 degree day in June, with over 100 vendors and dozens of sponsors participating. The 2013 event featured more than 100 performers on five stages.

References

External links

 Website of Seattle Out and Proud
 Website of PrideFest

Annual events in Washington (state)
Festivals in Seattle
LGBT culture in Seattle
Pride parades in Washington (state)